Tuanaimato is a geographical area near Apia, Samoa.

It is the site of the one hundred acre Faleata Sporting Complex which houses, among other facilities, a 12,000 seater soccer stadium (home of Tuanaimato Breeze, a Samoan soccer team), a baseball stadium, hockey fields and an 'aquatic centre' (for swimming, diving, synchronised swimming and water polo).

The Tuanaimato area was also the venue for much of the 2007 South Pacific Games.

List of sports facilities
Archery field
Baseball field
Beach volleyball courts
Cricket oval
Gymnasium
Hockey fields
Lawn bowls Centre
Samoa Aquatic Centre
Softball Field
General sports Centre
Squash Courts
Toleafoa S.Blatter Soccer Stadium

External links
Faleata Sports Complex at the 2007 South Pacific Games website

Sports venues in Samoa
Tuamasaga